Ladoo Baba Temple is a Hindu temple dedicated to Lord Shiva worshipped as Ladukeshwar but affectionately called Ladoo Baba in the town of Sharanakula in Nayagarh district of Orissa, India.  The temple dating back to medieval times shows a fusion of kalinga and dravidian temple architecture. Unlike most other Hindu temples the prayers have traditionally been conducted by priests belonging to low caste. The temple is an important pilgrimage for Shaivites in southern Orissa.Mahashivaratri is the major festival.

References

Hindu temples in Nayagarh district